Sagri  is a Town and Union council in Rawalpindi Tehsil of Rawalpindi District

External links
 http://schoolinglog.com/school/Government-Girls-Higher-Secondary-School-SAGRI-RAWALPINDI_72552.html
 https://www.facebook.com/search/top/?q=Sagri+Rawalpindi
 http://www.cellsaa.com/post-code-area/SAGRI
 http://www.schoolinglog.com/school/Government-Boys-Higher-Secondary-School-SAGRI-RAWALPINDI_72555.html
Populated places in Rawalpindi Tehsil
Union councils of Rawalpindi Tehsil